Pouteria buenaventurensis is a species of plant in the family Sapotaceae. It is found in Colombia and Panama.

References

buenaventurensis
Near threatened plants
Taxonomy articles created by Polbot
Taxa named by André Aubréville